Baitul Makmur Tanjung Uban Grand Mosque is the largest mosque in Bintan Island and is located in Simpang Makam Pahlawan,
Tanjung Uban, Riau Islands Province, Indonesia. The whole 1.6 hectares of area of Baitul Makmur Tanjung Uban Grand Mosque is waqf (endowment) of the deceased King Daud. The construction started in 2008, and it began to be used in 2012 even though the development process has not been fully completed. The mosque is expected to accommodate up to 3,000 pilgrims in the main hall, as well as 6,000 pilgrims with mosque courtyards. It has five domes, with a main dome and four small domes that surround it. This dome is made of mild steel, and rustproof. On the main dome has a diameter of 9 meters, which supposedly making this dome cost up to 600 million rupiah. The dome was decorated with colorful ornaments that symbolize the diversity of tribes and nations of Muslims.

See also 
 Islam in Indonesia
 List of mosques in Indonesia

References 

Mosques in Indonesia
Riau Islands